"Millionaire" is a single from English band Beady Eye, released on 2 May 2011.

Track listing
All songs written by Liam Gallagher, Gem Archer, and Andy Bell.

"Millionaire" – 3:17
"Man of Misery" – 2:39

"Man of Misery" was originally used, in demo form, in a promotional video for the Liam Gallagher run clothing line Pretty Green, and was originally credited as a Liam Gallagher solo song. The song was originally available as an iTunes exclusive for those who downloaded the album.

Music video
The accompanying promotional music video, directed by Charlie Lightening, was shot while the band were touring in Spain. In it, all four members of the band - plus live bassist, Jeff Wootton - drive through the Spanish countryside and along the coast, before ending up at a pub.

Chart performance

References

2011 singles
Songs written by Liam Gallagher
Beady Eye songs
Song recordings produced by Steve Lillywhite
Songs written by Gem Archer
Songs written by Andy Bell (musician)
Song recordings produced by Liam Gallagher
Song recordings produced by Gem Archer
Song recordings produced by Andy Bell (musician)